Herod I (c. 72 – 4 or 1 BCE), also known as Herod the Great, was a Roman Jewish client king of Judea, referred to as the Herodian kingdom. He is known for his colossal building projects throughout Judea, including his renovation of the Second Temple in Jerusalem and the expansion of the Temple Mount towards its north, the enclosure around the Cave of the Patriarchs in Hebron, the construction of the port at Caesarea Maritima, the fortress at Masada, and Herodium. Vital details of his life are recorded in the works of the 1st century CE Roman–Jewish historian Josephus.

Herod also appears in the Christian Gospel of Matthew as the ruler of Judea who orders the Massacre of the Innocents at the time of the birth of Jesus, although most Herod biographers do not believe that this event occurred. Despite his successes, including singlehandedly forging a new aristocracy from practically nothing, he has still been criticised by various historians. His reign polarizes opinion among historians, some viewing his legacy as evidence of success, and some viewing it as a reminder of his tyrannical rule.

Upon Herod's death, the Romans divided his kingdom among three of his sons and his sister: Herod Archelaus became ethnarch of Judea, Samaria, and Idumea; Herod Antipas became tetrarch of Galilee and Peraea; Philip became tetrarch of territories north and east of the Jordan River; and Salome I was given a toparchy including the cities of Jabneh, Ashdod, and Phasaelis.

Biography 
Herod was born around 72 BCE in Idumea, south of Judea. He was the second son of Antipater the Idumaean, a high-ranking official under ethnarch Hyrcanus II, and Cypros, a Nabatean Arab princess from Petra (in present-day Jordan). Herod's father was by descent an Edomite with a Jewish mother; his ancestors had converted to Judaism. Herod was raised as a Jew. Strabo, a contemporary of Herod, held that the Idumaeans, whom he identified as of Nabataean origin, constituted the majority of the population of western Judea, where they commingled with the Judaeans and adopted their customs. This is a view shared also by some modern scholarly works which consider Idumaeans as of Arab or Nabataean origins. Thus Herod's ethnic background was Arab on both sides of his family. According to the works of Josephus, Herod was a descendant of Eleazar Maccabeus (Auran) of the Hasmoneans.

Herod rose to power largely through his father's good relations with the Roman general and dictator Julius Caesar, who entrusted  Antipater with the public affairs of Judea. Herod was appointed provincial governor of Galilee in  47 BCE when Herod was about either 25 or 28 years old (Greek original: "15 years of age"). There he faithfully farmed the taxes of that region for the Roman Senate, and he met with success in ridding that region of bandits. Antipater's elder son, Phasael, served in the same capacity as governor of Jerusalem. During this time the young Herod cultivated a good relationship with Sextus Caesar, the acting Roman governor of Syria, who appointed Herod as general of Coelesyria and Samaria, greatly expanding his realm of influence. He enjoyed the backing of Rome, but the Sanhedrin condemned his brutality. When yet a private man, Herod had determined to punish Hyrcanus the Hasmonean king, who had once summoned Herod to stand trial for murder, but Herod was restrained from doing so by the intervention of his father and his elder brother.

In 41 BCE the Roman leader Mark Antony named Herod and his brother Phasael as tetrarchs. They were placed in this role to support Hyrcanus II. In 40 BCE Antigonus, Hyrcanus' nephew, took the Judean throne from his uncle with  the help of the  Parthians. Herod fled to Rome to plead with the Romans to restore Hyrcanus II to power. The Romans had a special interest in Judea because their general Pompey the Great had conquered Jerusalem in 63 BCE, thus placing the region in the Roman sphere of influence. In Rome, Herod was unexpectedly appointed King of the Jews by the Roman Senate. Josephus puts this in the year of the consulship of Calvinus and Pollio (40 BCE), but Appian places it in 39 BCE. Herod went back to Judea to win his kingdom from Antigonus. Toward the end of the campaign against Antigonus, Herod married the granddaughter of Hyrcanus II, Mariamne (known as Mariamne I), who was also a niece of Antigonus. Herod did this in an attempt to secure his claim to the throne and gain some Jewish favor. However, Herod already had a wife, Doris, and a young son, Antipater, and chose therefore to banish Doris and her child.

Herod and Sosius, the governor of Syria, at the behest of Mark Antony, set out with a large army in 37 BCE and captured Jerusalem, Herod then sending Antigonus for execution to Mark Antony. From this moment, Herod took the role as sole ruler of Judea and the title of basileus (Βασιλεύς, "king") for himself, ushering in the Herodian dynasty and ending the Hasmonean Dynasty. Josephus reports this as being in the year of the consulship of Agrippa and Gallus (37 BCE), but also says that it was exactly 27 years after Jerusalem fell to Pompey, which would indicate 36 BCE. Cassius Dio also reports that in 37 "the Romans accomplished nothing worthy of note" in the area. According to Josephus, Herod ruled for 37 years, 34 of them after capturing Jerusalem.

As some believe Herod's family were converts to Judaism, his religious commitment was questioned by some elements of Jewish society. When John Hyrcanus conquered the region of Idumaea (the Edom of the Hebrew Bible) in 140–130 BCE, he required all Idumaeans to obey Jewish law or to leave; most Idumaeans thus converted to Judaism, which meant that they had to be circumcised, and many had intermarried with the Jews and adopted their customs. While Herod publicly identified himself as a Jew and was considered as such by some, this religious identification was undermined by the decadent lifestyle of the Herodians, which would have earned them the antipathy of observant Jews.

Herod later executed several members of his own family, including his wife Mariamne I.

Reign in Judea 
Herod's rule marked a new beginning in the history of Judea. Judea had been ruled autonomously by the Hasmonean kings from 140 until 63 BCE. The Hasmonean kings retained their titles, but became clients of Rome after the conquest by Pompey in 63 BCE. Herod overthrew the Hasmonean Antigonus in a three-year-long war between 37 and 34 BCE, ruled under Roman overlordship until his death ca. 4 BCE, and officially passed on the throne to his sons, thus establishing his own, so-called Herodian dynasty.Herod was granted the title of "King of Judea" by the Roman Senate. As such, he was a vassal of the Roman Empire, expected to support the interests of his Roman patrons. Nonetheless, just when Herod obtained leadership in Judea, his rule faced two threats. The first threat came from his mother-in-law Alexandra, who sought to regain power for her family, the Hasmoneans, whose dynasty Herod had overthrown in 37 BCE (see Siege of Jerusalem). In the same year, Cleopatra married the Roman leader Antony.  Recognizing Cleopatra's influence over Antony, Alexandra asked Cleopatra for aid in making Aristobulus III the High Priest. As a member of the Hasmonean family, Aristobulus III might partially repair the fortunes of the Hasmoneans if made High Priest. Alexandra's request was made, but Cleopatra urged Alexandra to leave Judea with Aristobulus III and visit Antony. Herod received word of this plot, and feared that if Antony met Aristobolus III in person he might name Aristobulus III King of Judea. This concern induced Herod, in 35 BCE, to order the assassination of Aristobulus, ending this first threat to Herod's throne. The marriage of 37 BCE also sparked a power struggle between Roman leaders Octavian, who would later be called Augustus, and Antony. Herod, owing his throne to Rome, had to pick a side, and he chose Antony. In 31 at Actium, Antony lost to Octavian, posing a second threat to Herod's rule. Herod had to regain Octavian's support if he was to keep his throne. At Rhodes in 31 BCE, Herod, through his ability to keep Judea open to Rome as a link to the wealth of Syria and Egypt, and ability to defend the frontier, convinced Octavian that he would be loyal to him. Herod continued to rule his subjects as he saw fit. Despite the autonomy afforded to Herod in his internal reign over Judea, restrictions were placed upon him in his relations with other kingdoms.

Herod's support from the Roman Empire was a major factor in enabling him to maintain his authority over Judea. There have been mixed interpretations concerning Herod's popularity during his reign. In The Jewish War, Josephus characterizes Herod's rule in generally favorable terms, and gives Herod the benefit of the doubt for the infamous events that took place during his reign. However, in his later work, Jewish Antiquities, Josephus emphasizes the tyrannical authority that many scholars have come to associate with Herod's reign.

Herod's despotic rule has been demonstrated by many of his security measures aimed at suppressing the contempt his people, especially Jews, had towards him. For instance, it has been suggested that Herod used secret police to monitor and report the feelings of the general populace toward him. He sought to prohibit protests, and had opponents removed by force. He had a bodyguard of 2,000 soldiers. Josephus describes various units of Herod's personal guard taking part in Herod's funeral, including the Doryphnoroi, and a Thracian, Celtic (probably Gallic) and Germanic contingent. While the term Doryphnoroi does not have an ethnic connotation, the unit was probably composed of distinguished veteran soldiers and young men from the most influential Jewish families. Thracians had served in the Jewish armies since the Hasmonean dynasty, while the Celtic contingent were former bodyguards of Cleopatra given as a gift by Augustus to Herod following the Battle of Actium. The Germanic contingent was modeled upon Augustus's personal bodyguard, the Germani Corporis Custodes, responsible for guarding the palace.

Herod undertook many colossal building projects. Around 19 BCE, he began a massive expansion project on the Temple Mount. In addition to fully rebuilding and enlarging the Second Jewish Temple, he artificially expanded the platform on which it stood, doubling it in size. Today's Western Wall formed part of the retaining perimeter wall of this platform. In addition, Herod also used the latest technology in hydraulic cement and underwater construction to build the harbor at Caesarea Maritima. While Herod's zeal for building transformed Judea, his motives were not selfless. Although he built fortresses (Masada, Herodium, Alexandrium, Hyrcania, and Machaerus) in which he and his family could take refuge in case of insurrection, these vast projects were also intended to gain the support of the Jews and improve his reputation as a leader.  Herod also built Sebaste and other pagan cities because he wanted to appeal to the country's substantial pagan population. In order to fund these projects, Herod utilized a Hasmonean taxation system that heavily burdened the Judean people. Nevertheless, these enterprises brought employment and opportunities for the people's provision. In some instances, Herod took it upon himself to provide for his people in times of need, such as during a severe famine that occurred in 25 BCE.

Although he made many attempts at conforming to traditional Jewish laws, there were more instances where Herod was insensitive, which constitutes one of the major Jewish complaints of Herod as highlighted in Josephus' Antiquities of the Jews. In Jerusalem, Herod introduced foreign forms of entertainment, and erected a golden eagle at the entrance of the Temple, which suggested a greater interest in the welfare of Rome than of Jews. Herod's taxes garnered a bad reputation: his constant concern for his reputation led him to make frequent, expensive gifts, increasingly emptying the kingdom's coffers, and such lavish spending upset his Jewish subjects. The two major Jewish sects of the day, the Pharisees and the Sadducees, both showed opposition to Herod. The Pharisees were discontented because Herod disregarded many of their demands with respect to the Temple's construction. The Sadducees, who were closely associated with priestly responsibilities in the Temple, opposed Herod because he replaced their high priests with outsiders from Babylonia and Alexandria, in an effort to gain support from the Jewish Diaspora. Herod's outreach efforts gained him little, and at the end of his reign anger and dissatisfaction were common amongst Jews. Heavy outbreaks of violence and riots followed Herod's death in many cities, including Jerusalem, as pent-up resentments boiled over. The scope of the disturbances sparked hopes that the Jews of Judea might some day overthrow the Roman overlords, hopes reawakened decades later in the outbreak of the First Jewish-Roman War in 66 CE.

Herod and Augustus 
The relationship between Herod and Augustus demonstrates the fragile politics of a deified Emperor and a King who rules over the Jewish people and their holy lands. As they interact, Herod's focus for satisfying the Jewish and non-Jewish people of his kingdom has to be balanced with satisfying Augustus' intentions of spreading the culture, architecture and values of Rome throughout his empire. The sway of Augustus and the Roman Empire on the policy led to the development of Romanized construction throughout Herod's Kingdom. An example of Herod's Architectural expansion of Judea in devotion to Rome can be seen with the third temple he commissioned, the Augusteum, a temple dedicated to Augustus.

Architectural achievements

Herod's most famous and ambitious project was the expansion of the Second Temple in Jerusalem which was undertaken so that he would "have a capital city worthy of his dignity and grandeur" and with this reconstruction Herod hoped to gain more support from the Jews. Recent findings suggest that the Temple Mount walls and Robinson's Arch may not have been completed until at least 20 years after his death, during the reign of Herod Agrippa II.

In the 18th year of his reign (20–19 BCE), Herod rebuilt the Temple on "a more magnificent scale".  Although work on out-buildings and courts continued for another 80 years, the new Temple was finished in a year and a half. To comply with religious law, Herod employed 1,000 priests as masons and carpenters in the rebuilding. The finished temple, which was destroyed in 70 CE, is sometimes referred to as Herod's Temple. Today, only the four retaining walls remain standing, including the Western Wall. These walls created a flat platform (the Temple Mount) upon which the Temple was then constructed.

Herod's other achievements include the development of water supplies for Jerusalem, building fortresses such as Masada and Herodium, and founding new cities such as Caesarea Maritima and the enclosures of Cave of the Patriarchs and Mamre in Hebron. He and Cleopatra owned a monopoly over the extraction of asphalt from the Dead Sea, which was used in shipbuilding. He leased copper mines on Cyprus from the Roman emperor.

New Testament references

Herod appears in the Gospel of Matthew, which describes an event known as the Massacre of the Innocents. According to this account, after the birth of Jesus, a group of magi from the East visited Herod to inquire the whereabouts of "the one having been born king of the Jews", because they had seen his star in the east (or, according to certain translations, at its rising) and therefore wanted to pay him homage. Herod, as King of the Jews, was alarmed at the prospect of a usurper. Herod assembled the chief priests and scribes of the people and asked them where the "Anointed One" (the Messiah,) was to be born. They answered, in Bethlehem, citing Micah 5:2. Herod therefore sent the magi to Bethlehem, instructing them to search for the child and, after they had found him, to "report to me, so that I too may go and worship him". However, after they had found Jesus, they were warned in a dream not to report back to Herod. Similarly, Joseph was warned in a dream that Herod intended to kill Jesus, so he and his family fled to Egypt. When Herod realized he had been outwitted, he gave orders to kill all boys of the age of two and under in Bethlehem and its vicinity. Joseph and his family stayed in Egypt until Herod's death, then moved to Nazareth in Galilee to avoid living under Herod's son Archelaus.

Most modern biographers of Herod, and probably a majority of biblical scholars, dismiss Matthew's story as a literary device. Contemporary non-biblical sources, including Jewish historian Josephus and the surviving writings of Nicolaus of Damascus (who knew Herod personally), provide no corroboration for Matthew's account of the massacre, and it is not mentioned in the Gospel of Luke.  Classical historian Michael Grant states "[t]he tale is not history but myth or folk-lore", while Peter Richardson notes that the story's absence from the Gospel of Luke and the accounts of Josephus "work[s] against the account's accuracy". Richardson suggests that the event in Matthew's gospel was inspired by Herod's murder of his own sons. Jodi Magness has said that "many scholars believe that the massacre of the innocents never occurred, but instead was inspired by Herod's reputation". Others, such as Paul Maier, suggest that since Bethlehem was a smaller town, the slaughter of about a half dozen children would not have warranted a mention from Josephus.

Death
Herod died in Jericho, after an excruciatingly painful, putrefying illness of uncertain cause, known to posterity as "Herod's Evil". Josephus states that the pain of his illness led Herod to attempt suicide by stabbing, and that the attempt was thwarted by his cousin. In some much later narratives and depictions, the attempt succeeds; for example, in the 12th-century Eadwine Psalter. Other medieval dramatizations, such as the Ordo Rachelis, follow Josephus' account.

Josephus stated that Herod was so concerned that no one would mourn his death that he commanded a large group of distinguished men to come to Jericho, and he gave an order that they should be killed at the time of his death so that the displays of grief that he craved would take place; but his brother in law Alexas and his sister Salome did not carry out this wish.

Year of death: either 5, 4 or 1 BCE, or 1 CE

Most scholarship concerning the date of Herod's death follows Emil Schürer's calculations, which suggest that the date was in or around 4 BCE; this is three years earlier than the previous consensus and tradition (1 BCE).
Two of Herod's sons, Archelaus and Philip the Tetrarch, dated their rule from 4 BCE, though Archelaus apparently held royal authority during Herod's lifetime. Philip's reign would last for 37 years, until his death in the 20th year of Tiberius (34 CE), which implies his accession as 4 BCE.

Some scholars support the traditional date of 1 BCE for Herod's death.

Yet others support 1 CE for the probable date of Herod's death.
Filmer and Steinmann, for example, propose that Herod died in 1 BCE, and that his heirs backdated their reigns to 4 or 3 BCE to assert an overlapping with Herod's rule, and bolster their own legitimacy.

In Josephus' account, Herod's death was preceded by first a Jewish fast day (10 Tevet 3761/Sun 24 Dec 1BC), a lunar eclipse (29 Dec 1BC) and followed by Passover (27 March 1AD). Objections to the 4 BCE date include the assertion that there was not nearly enough time between the eclipse on March 13 and Passover on April 10 for the recorded events surrounding Herod's death to have taken place.
In 66 AD, Eleazar ben Hanania compiled the Megillat Taanit, which entry on 2 Shevat (14 Jan 1AD) mentions and celebrates Herod's death.

Successors
Augustus respected the terms of Herod's will, which stipulated the division of Herod's kingdom among three of his sons.  Augustus recognised Herod's son Herod Archelaus as ethnarch of Judea, Samaria, and Idumea  to 6 CE, referred to as the tetrarchy of Judea. Augustus then judged Archelaus incompetent to rule, removed him from power, and combined the provinces of Samaria, Judea proper, and Idumea into Iudaea province. This enlarged province was ruled by a prefect until the year 41 CE. As to Herod's other sons, Herod Antipas  was tetrarch of Galilee and Peraea from Herod's death to 39 CE when he was deposed and exiled; Philip became tetrarch of territories north and east of the Jordan, namely Iturea, Trachonitis, Batanea, Gaulanitis, Auranitis and Paneas, and ruled until his death in 34 CE.

Herod's tomb

The location of Herod's tomb is documented by Josephus, who writes, "And the body was carried two hundred furlongs, to Herodium, where he had given order to be buried." Professor Ehud Netzer, an archaeologist from the Hebrew University, read the writings of Josephus and focused his search on the vicinity of the pool and its surroundings. An article in the New York Times states,
Lower Herodium consists of the remains of a large palace, a race track, service quarters, and a monumental building whose function is still a mystery. Perhaps, says Ehud Netzer, who excavated the site, it is Herod's mausoleum. Next to it is a pool, almost twice as large as modern Olympic-size pools.

On May 7, 2007, an Israeli team of archaeologists of Hebrew University, led by Netzer, announced they had discovered the tomb. The site is located at the exact location given by Josephus, atop tunnels and water pools, at a flattened desert site, halfway up the hill to Herodium, 12 kilometers (7.5 mi) south of Jerusalem. The tomb contained a broken sarcophagus but no remains of a body.

Not all scholars agree with Netzer: in an article for the Palestine Exploration Quarterly, archaeologist David Jacobson (University of Oxford) wrote that "these finds are not conclusive on their own and they also raise new questions." In October 2013, archaeologists Joseph Patrich and Benjamin Arubas also challenged the identification of the tomb as that of Herod. According to Patrich and Arubas, the tomb is too modest to be Herod's and has several unlikely features. Roi Porat, who replaced Netzer as excavation leader after the latter's death, stood by the identification.

The Israel Nature and Parks Authority and the Gush Etzion Regional Council intend to recreate the tomb out of a light plastic material, a proposal that has received strong criticism from major Israeli archeologists.

Opinions of his reign 

Macrobius (c. 400 CE), one of the last pagan writers in Rome, in his book Saturnalia, wrote: "When it was heard that, as part of the slaughter of boys up to two years old, Herod, king of the Jews, had ordered his own son to be killed, he [the Emperor Augustus] remarked, 'It is better to be Herod's pig [Gr. hys] than his son' [Gr. hyios]". This was a reference of how Herod, as a Jew, would not kill pigs, but had three of his sons, and many others, killed.

According to contemporary historians, Herod the Great "is perhaps the only figure in ancient Jewish history who has been loathed equally by Jewish and Christian posterity", depicted both by Jews and Christians as a tyrant and bloodthirsty ruler. The study of Herod's reign includes polarizing opinions on the man himself. Modern critics have described him as "the evil genius of the Judean nation", and as one who would be "prepared to commit any crime in order to gratify his unbounded ambition." His extraordinary spending spree is cited as one of the causes of the serious impoverishment of the people he ruled, adding to the opinion that his reign was exclusively negative. 
Herod's religious policies gained a mixed response from the Jewish populace. Although Herod considered himself king of the Jews, he let it be known that he also represented the non-Jews living in Judea, building temples for other religions outside of the Jewish areas of his kingdom. Many Jews questioned the authenticity of Herod's Judaism on account of his Idumean background and his infamous murders of members of his family. However, he generally respected traditional Jewish observances in his public life. For instance, he minted coins without human images to be used in Jewish areas and acknowledged the sanctity of the Second Temple by employing priests as artisans in its construction.

Along with holding some respect for the Jewish culture in his public life, there is also evidence of Herod's sensitivity toward Jewish traditions in his private life with the presence of around 40 ritual baths or mikvehs found in several of his palaces. These mikvehs were known for being used in Jewish purity rituals during this time where Jewish people could submerge themselves in these pools and purify their bodies without the presence of a priest. There is some speculation as to whether or not these baths were actual mikvehs as they have also been identified as stepped frigidarium or Roman cold-water baths; however, several historians have identified these baths as a combination of both types. While it has been proven that Herod showed a great amount of disrespect toward the Jewish religion, scholar Eyal Regev suggests that the presence of these ritual baths shows that Herod found ritual purity important enough in his private life to place a large number of these baths in his palaces despite his several connections to gentiles and pagan cults. These baths also show, Regev continues, that the combination of the Roman frigidarium and the Jewish mikvehs suggests that Herod sought for there to be some type of combination between the Roman and Jewish cultures as he enjoyed the purity of Jewish tradition and the comfort of Roman luxury simultaneously.

However, he was also praised for his work, being considered the greatest builder in Jewish history, and one who "knew his place and followed [the] rules." In fact, what is left of his building ventures are now popular tourist attractions in the Middle East, which many have come to cherish as both a historical and religious area.

Chronology

30s BCE
 39–37 BCE – Roman war against Antigonus. After the conquest of Jerusalem and victory over Antigonus, Mark Antony executes him.
 36 BCE – Herod makes his 17-year-old brother-in-law, Aristobulus III, high priest, fearing that the Jews would appoint Aristobulus III as "King of the Jews" in his place.
 35 BCE – Aristobulus III is drowned at a party on Herod's orders.
 32 BCE – The war against Nabatea begins, with victory one year later.
 31 BCE – Judea suffers a devastating earthquake. Octavian defeats Mark Antony, so Herod switches allegiance to Octavian, later known as Augustus.
 30 BCE – Herod is shown great favor by Octavian, who at Rhodes confirms him as King of Judea.

20s BCE
 29 BCE – Josephus writes that Herod had great passion and also great jealousy concerning his wife, Mariamne I. She learns of Herod's plans to murder her, and stops sleeping with him. Herod puts her on trial on a charge of adultery. His sister, Salome I, was chief witness against her. Mariamne I's mother Alexandra made an appearance and incriminated her own daughter. Historians say her mother was next on Herod's list to be executed and did this only to save her own life. Mariamne was executed, and Alexandra declared herself Queen, stating that Herod was mentally unfit to serve. Josephus wrote that this was Alexandra's strategic mistake; Herod executed her without trial.
 28 BCE – Herod executed his brother-in-law Kostobar (husband of Salome, father to Berenice) for conspiracy. Large festival in Jerusalem, as Herod had built a theatre and an amphitheatre.
 27 BCE – An assassination attempt on Herod was foiled. To honor Augustus, Herod rebuilt Samaria and renamed it Sebaste.
 25 BCE – Herod imported grain from Egypt and started an aid program to combat the widespread hunger and disease that followed a massive drought. He also waived a third of the taxes. Herod began construction on Caesarea Maritima and its harbor.
 23 BCE – Herod built a palace in Jerusalem and the fortress Herodion (Herodium) in Judea. He married his third wife, Mariamne II, the daughter of the priest Simon Boethus; immediately Herodes deprived Jesus the son of Phabet of the high priesthood and conferred that dignity on Simon.
 22 BCE – The Roman emperor Augustus granted him the regions Trachonitis, Batanaea, and Auranitis to the northeast.
 Circa 20 BCE – Expansion started on the Temple Mount; Herod completely rebuilt the Second Temple of Jerusalem.

10s BCE
 Circa 18 BCE – Herod traveled for the second time to Rome.
 14 BCE – Herod supported the Jews in Anatolia and Cyrene. Owing to the prosperity in Judaea he waived a quarter of the taxes.
 13 BCE – Herod made his first-born son Antipater (his son by Doris) first heir in his will.
 12 BCE – Herod suspected his sons from his marriage to Mariamne I, Alexander and Aristobulus, of threatening his life. He took them to Aquileia to be tried. Augustus reconciled the three. Herod supported the financially strapped Olympic Games and ensured their future. Herod amended his will so that Alexander and Aristobulus rose in the royal succession, but Antipater would be higher in the succession.
 Circa 10 BCE – The newly expanded temple in Jerusalem was inaugurated. War against the Nabateans began.

Last decade BCE

 9 BCE – Caesarea Maritima was inaugurated. Owing to the course of the war against the Nabateans, Herod fell into disgrace with Augustus. Herod again suspected Alexander of plotting to kill him.
 8 BCE – Herod accused his sons Alexander and Aristobulus of high treason. Herod reconciled with Augustus, who also gave him the permission to proceed legally against his sons.
 7 BCE – The court hearing took place in Berytos (Beirut) before a Roman court. His sons Alexander and Aristobulus were found guilty and executed. The succession changed so that Antipater was the exclusive successor to the throne. In second place the succession incorporated (Herod) Philip, his son by Mariamne II.
 6 BCE – Herod proceeded against the Pharisees.
 5 BCE – Antipater was brought before the court charged with the intended murder of Herod. Herod, by now seriously ill, named his son (Herod) Antipas (from his fourth marriage with Malthace) as his successor.
 4 BCE – Young disciples smashed the golden eagle over the main entrance of the Temple of Jerusalem after the Pharisee teachers claimed it was an idolatrous Roman symbol. Herod arrested them, brought them to court, and sentenced them. Augustus approved the death penalty for Antipater. Herod then executed his son, and again changed his will: Archelaus (from the marriage with Malthace) would rule as ethnarch over the tetrachy of Judea, while Antipas (by Malthace) and Philip (from the fifth marriage with Cleopatra of Jerusalem) would rule as tetrarchs over Galilee and Peraea (Transjordan), also over Gaulanitis (Golan), Trachonitis (Hebrew: Argob), Batanaea (now Ard-el-Bathanyeh) and Panias. Salome I was also given a small toparchy in the Gaza region. As Augustus did not confirm his will, no one received the title of King; however, the three sons were granted rule of the stated territories.

Wives and children

It is very probable that Herod had more children, especially with the last wives, and also that he had more daughters, as female births at that time were often not recorded. As polygamy (the practice of having multiple wives at once)  was then permitted under Jewish law, Herod's later marriages were almost certainly polygamous.

Family trees

Ancestors

Marriages and descendants

 Notes.
† 
‡ Family Tree of Herod Rick Swartzentrover

See also
 Cultural depictions of Herod the Great
 Herodian dynasty
 Herodian kingdom
 Herod's Palace 
 Judean date palm: Germination of 2000-year-old seed
 List of biblical figures identified in extra-biblical sources

References

Sources
Josephus, The Jewish War
Josephus, Antiquities of the Jews

Further reading 
 Bourgel, Jonathan Hérode Roi d'Israël (Paris: Cerf, 2019).
 
 
 Günther, Linda-Marie (hg.) Herodes und Jerusalem (Stuttgart: Franz Steiner Verlag, 2009).
 Günther, Linda-Marie (hg.) Herodes und Rom (Stuttgart: Franz Steiner Verlag, 2007).
 Jacobson, David M. and Nikos Kokkinos (eds). Herod and Augustus: Papers Held at the Institute of Jewish Studies Conference, University College London, 21–23 June 2005 (Leiden, Brill, 2009) (IJS Studies in Judaica, 6).
 Kasher, Aryeh and Witztum, Eliezer. King Herod: A Persecuted Persecutor. A Case Study in Psychohistory and Psychobiography (Berlin and New York, Walter de Gruyter, 2006).
 Knoblet, Jerry.  [ Herod the Great].  Lanham, Maryland:  University Press of America, 2005. 
 Kokkinos, Nikos. The Herodian Dynasty: Origins, Role in Society and Eclipse (Sheffield: Sheffield Academic,1998).
 
 Marshak, Adam Kolman. The Many Faces of Herod the Great. Grand Rapids, Michigan: Wm B. Eerdmans, 2015.
 
 Netzer, Ehud. The Architecture of Herod, the Great Builder (Tübingen: Mohr Siebeck, 2006).
 
 Richardson, Peter. Herod the King of the Jews and Friend of the Romans (Edinburgh: 1999).
 
 Schalit, Abraham. Konig Herodes - der Mann und sein Werk. Berlin, 1969 (in German, expansion of the former book by the same name from 1960 in Hebrew: הורדוס המלך – האיש ופועלו. ירושלים: מוסד ביאליק).
 
 Schwentzel, Christian-Georges (2011). Hérode le Grand. Paris: Pygmalion.

External links

 "Herod the Great: The King's Final Journey", The Israel Museum, Jerusalem, February 13, 2013 – October 5, 2013. Curators: Dudi Mevorach and Silvia Rozenberg.
 Herod and the Herodian Dynasty  The Jewish History Resource Center – Project of the Dinur Center for Research in Jewish History, The Hebrew University of Jerusalem

 
70s BC births
0s BC deaths
1st-century BC Herodian rulers
1st-century BC rulers in Asia
Biblical murderers
Herodian dynasty
Judaism-related controversies
Masada
New Testament people
Roman client rulers